Miguel Ramos Corrada was a Spanish academic, born on 12 October (1949) in Llerandi (near Parres, Asturies, Spain), but lived in Xixón, where he died on 20 August (2013)

He was graduate in Romanic Philology in Oviedo University in 1971, he doctorated in 1983 with his thesis about Pepín de Pría. In 1984 was engaged by ALLA (Academia de la Llingua Asturiana/ Academy of the Asturian Language). Was vice-president of that institution.

Was the principal of the UNED in Asturies since 1984 and professor in that center. Is considered an expert in Asturian literature and an authority about Pepín de Pría.

Bibliography
Sociedad y literatura bable, 1839–1936 (1982)
Pría, Pepín de; Obres completes / José García Peláez (Pepín de Pría) (1993)
La formación del concepto de historia de la literatura nacional española: las aportaciones de Pedro J. Pidal y Antonio Gil de Zárate (2001)

1949 births
2013 deaths
Spanish philologists
Asturian language
People from Oriente (Asturian comarca)
People from Gijón
University of Oviedo alumni